The Great Basin redband trout (Oncorhynchus mykiss newberrii) is one of three redband trout subspecies of the rainbow trout in the western United States.

The Great Basin redband trout is native to drainages in south central Oregon east of the Cascade range, extreme north east California and extreme north west Nevada.  They occur in seven isolated drainages—the Upper Klamath Lake basin, Fort Rock basin, Harney-Malheur basin, Catlow basin, Warner Lakes basin, Goose Lake basin, and the Chewaucan basin.

References

Further reading
 Steens Mountain Cooperative Management and Protection Act of 2000 (Public Law 106-399).  Passed October 30, 2000.  (While not an officially designated threatened or endangered species, the redband Trout is recognized as important resource, and this law sets aside land in Oregon for protection and research of redband Trout.)

Oncorhynchus
Trout, Great Basin
Trout, Great Basin
Trout, Great Basin
Fauna of the Great Basin
Trout, Great Basin
Trout, Great Basin
Trout, Great Basin
Natural history of Modoc County, California
~
Fauna without expected TNC conservation status